Cladonema is a genus of hydrozoa belonging to the family Cladonematidae.

The genus has almost cosmopolitan distribution.

Species:

Cladonema californicum 
Cladonema myersi 
Cladonema novaezelandiae 
Cladonema pacificum 
Cladonema radiatum 
Cladonema timmsii

References

Cladonematidae
Hydrozoan genera